Dasht (Dashh-th) ( Desert) is a Pakistani drama television series. It is a Balochi tribal love story directed by Abid Ali and F H Qureshi and is written by Munnu Bhai. Noman Ijaz and Atiqa Odho acted in the lead roles alongside supporting actors such as Ayub Khoso, Abid Ali, Noor Muhammad Lashari, Fazila Qazi, Asad Malik, & Sabiha Khanum.

Dasht aired on 5 February 1993 on Pakistan's first private channel NTM and won critical acclaim and was a major commercial success catapulting the onscreen pair of Atiqa Odho and Nauman Ejaz to stardom. Audiences appreciated the screen chemistry between Atiqa Odho and Nauman Ejaz and the duo later worked together in several successful dramas including Nijaat (1993), Talaash (Telefilm 1994), Arzoo Jeenay Ki Tu Nahin (2014), and Khan (2017) and are often referred to as Pakistan television's most loved on-screen couple. The drama also launched the successful debut career of Asad Malik.

The music was composed by Wajid Ali Nashad with the lyrics written by poet, critic, and playwright Atta Shad. The soundtracks of the drama were equally successful and popular. The cinematography of this drama is also unique and for the first time in Pakistani television history, a series of songs were used which was well-received by audiences (which is rather rare in a Pakistani drama). Atiqa Odho's Balochi attire and jewelry and Nauman Ejaz's Balochi-style turban chaddar & Bughti Shalwar became a trend.  Shugal Pakistan ranks the drama amongst the "11 Unforgettable Classic Dramas of Pakistan".

Plot
The story is set among three warring tribes in rural Balochistan (in Pakistan). Born into this tribal warfare are Shahtaaj Atiqa Odho and Balaaj Noman Ejaz. Despite being surrounded by violence all their lives, both are gentle souls with a love of music and poetry. While both are from opposing tribes - they ultimately fall in love! Fearing that their union could unite two tribes, the head of the third tries everything to stop this from happening. The Drama was a tale of unrequited love and parental opposition while the culture, thinking, and issues of tribes in Balochistan served as sidelines of Shahtaaj's (Atiqa Odho) and Balaaj's (Nauman Ejaz) story of two youngsters from rival tribes who fall in love.. The plot was a modern-day take on classic tragic romance stories such as Layla and Majnun, Heer Ranjha, and Romeo and Juliet.

Cast
 Atiqa Odho as Shahtaaj
 Nauman Ejaz as Mir Balaaj 
 Ayub Khoso as Mir Guwaraam
 Abid Ali as Shams Shah
 Shaista Jabeen as Duresham
 Naina as Hani
 Fazila Qazi as Sajjal
 Humaira Ali as the voice of Shahtaaj in the song "Rabab Kehta Hai"
 Asad Malik as Mir Bebarg Mehdi (Mir Balaaj and Shahtaj's son)
 Azra Aftab as Duresham's mother (Sardar Hamza Salari's sister)
 Noor Mohammad Lashari as Sardar Nadir Jumbail (Antagonist)
 Rasheed Naz as Sardar Zakaullah Mehdi (Father of Mir Balaaj Mehdi)
 Mohsin Gillani as Sardar Hamza Salari (Shahtaj's father and Mir Guwaraam's uncle) (dead)
 Sabiha Khanum as Dai mah
 Nayyar Ejaz as Shaikh Jumbail (son of Sardar Nadir Jumbail)
 Zahid Saleem as Nuro
 Robina Arshi as Sakeena

Music

Critical reception
In 1993, the onscreen pair of Atiqa Odho & Nauman Ejaz "shot into stardom" following the release of Dasht. According to critics "The drama which proudly displayed Baloch traditions, was memorable in terms of its dialogues, plot twists, superb acting, cinematography, and music." Dasht was Abid Ali's first self-produced and self-directed drama serial which became a hit project of its time and this happened to be the first-ever private production in Pakistan.

References

1993 Pakistani television series debuts
1993 Pakistani television series endings
Pakistani drama television series
Urdu-language television shows